Mefjordvær is a fishing village in Senja Municipality in Troms og Finnmark county, Norway. In 2001, there were 179 residents of the village. Mefjordvær Chapel is located in this village.

References

Senja
Villages in Troms